Unit for Research and Development of Information Products (URDIP) is a research institute located in Pune under the Council of Scientific & Industrial Research (CSIR), Government of India.

References

External links
http://www.urdip.res.in

Council of Scientific and Industrial Research
Research institutes in Pune
Multidisciplinary research institutes
Year of establishment missing